4:45 AM is the third studio album  from Chilean progressive-rock band Aisles. It was released on October 29, 2013 through Presagio Records.

Critical reception
The album has been well received by critics.  Brian McKinnon of Prog Rock Music Talk gave 4:45 AM a 5/5 review stating, “4:45 AM is their third album and it is nothing short of a masterwork of art.  It is the reason people fall in love with music in the first place. If you are in any way a fan of progressive rock, than I cannot recommend Aisles’ 4:45 AM to you enough.  If there is a band to take a risk on, then Aisles is that band to do so, because this album is everything that this type of music should strive to be.  It is fresh, challenging, inspired, touching, and so much more.  A complete experience from start to finish, 4:45 AM is an astounding piece of work for the ages”. Progshine also gave the album a positive review stating, “4:45AM is an assured and thrilling work from a talented band that frequently sounds so defiantly original, like no- one other prog band at the moment, and the way they implement their emotive vocals with the same passion that most prog bands only give to their instrumental passages is completely inspiring”.

Track listing

 All songs written by Aisles

Personnel
Aisles:
 Sebastián Vergara – lead vocals.
 Germán Vergara – guitars, vocals, keyboards.
 Felipe Candia – drums, percussion.
 Rodrigo Sepúlveda – guitar, vocals.
 Alejandro Meléndez – keyboards.
 Daniel Baird-Kerr – bass

Additional musicians:
 Constanza Maulén – Vocals on “Sorrow”, “4:45 AM” and “Shallow and Daft
 David Núñez – Violin on “Sorrow”, “Hero and “The Sacrifice”
 Diana Brown – Violin on “Sorrow”, “Hero and “The Sacrifice”
 Valentina Maza – Viola on Violin on “Sorrow”, “Hero and “The Sacrifice”
 Alejandro Barría – Cello on “Sorrow”, “Hero and “The Sacrifice”
 Nelson Arriagada – Contrabass on “Sorrow”, “Hero and “The Sacrifice”

References

2013 albums
Aisles albums